The 1955–56 Hapoel Tel Aviv season was the club's 33rd season since its establishment in 1923, and 8th since the establishment of the State of Israel.

At the start of the season, the league which started during the previous season was completed, with the club finishing 3rd. The new league season, with the top division being renamed Liga Leumit, began on 3 December 1955 and was completed on 3 June 1956, with the club once again finishing in 3rd place.

Match Results

Legend

International friendly matches
During the season Hapoel Tel Aviv played two international friendly matches, losing both.

1954–55 Liga Alef
The league began on 6 February 1955, and by the time the previous season ended, only 20 rounds of matches were completed, with the final 6 rounds being played during September and October 1955.

Final table

Matches

Results by match

1955–56 Liga Leumit

Final table

Matches

Results by match

Shapira Cup
In October and November, while the promotion playoffs and the State Cup were being played, two cup competitions were organized by Liga Leumit Clubs, the second edition of the Shapira Cup, and the Netanya 25th Anniversary Cup. Maccabi Haifa, Hapoel Petah Tikva, Hapoel Tel Aviv and Maccabi Tel Aviv played for the Shapira Cup, named after former Hapoel Tel Aviv treasurer Yosef Shapira. The competition was designed to be played as a double round-robin tournament but the competition was delayed after the teams playing only two matches each, as the third round matches were postponed due to weather conditions and then due to the 1954–55 Israel State Cup final, which involved Maccabi Tel Aviv and Hapoel Petah Tikva. As league matches started on 3 December 1955, the competition was abandoned altogether.

Table

References

Hapoel Tel Aviv F.C. seasons
Hapoel Tel Aviv